Devyani Suhas Pharande is an Indian female politician and member of the Bharatiya Janata Party. Pharande is a member of the Maharashtra Legislative Assembly from the Nashik Central constituency in Nashik district and was elected to the seat in 2014 Maharashtra Legislative Assembly election and 2019 Maharashtra Legislative Assembly election.

Electoral record

References 

People from Nashik
Bharatiya Janata Party politicians from Maharashtra
Members of the Maharashtra Legislative Assembly
Living people
21st-century Indian politicians
Year of birth missing (living people)